Brussels International Exposition may refer to:
 Brussels International Exposition (1897)
 Brussels International 1910
 Brussels International Exposition (1935)

See also
 Expo 58